Baron Glenarthur, of Carlung in the County of Ayr, is a title in the Peerage of the United Kingdom. It was created in 1918 for the Scottish businessman Sir Matthew Arthur, 1st Baronet. He had already been created a baronet, of Carlung in the County of Ayr, on 28 November 1902. The title of the barony was derived from the joining of his mother's maiden surname name of Glen and his patronymic Arthur.

He was the oldest son of Glasgow merchant, James Arthur who founded Arthur & Company Limited, James Arthur was originally in business with the Frasers. Matthew was also first cousin to Sir Thomas Glen-Coats, 1st Baronet. , the titles are held by his great-grandson, the fourth Baron, who succeeded his father in 1976. He notably held office in the Conservative administrations of Margaret Thatcher and is now one of the ninety elected hereditary peers that remain in the House of Lords after the passing of the House of Lords Act 1999.

Barons Glenarthur (1918)
Matthew Arthur, 1st Baron Glenarthur (1852–1928)
(James) Cecil Arthur, 2nd Baron Glenarthur (1883–1942)
Matthew Arthur, 3rd Baron Glenarthur (1909–1976)
Simon Mark Arthur, 4th Baron Glenarthur (b. 1944)

The heir apparent is the present holder's only son, Hon. Edward Alexander Arthur (b. 1973).

Line of succession

  Matthew Arthur, 1st Baron Glenarthur (1852–1928)
  (James) Cecil Arthur, 2nd Baron Glenarthur (1883–1942)
  Matthew Arthur, 3rd Baron Glenarthur (1909–1976)
  Simon Mark Arthur, 4th Baron Glenarthur (born 1944)
 (1) Hon. Edward Alexander Arthur (b. 1973)
 (2) Hon. Matthew Richard Arthur (b. 1948)
 (3) Matthew Frederick Michael Arthur (b. 1981)

References

Sources

Kidd, Charles; Williamson, David (editors). Debrett's Peerage and Baronetage (1990 edition). New York: St Martin's Press, 1990.

Baronies in the Peerage of the United Kingdom
Noble titles created in 1918